Grassroots Bangladesh Nationalist Party (Bengali: তৃণমূল বাংলাদেশ জাতীয়তাবাদী দল/তৃণমূল বিএনপি), more commonly known as Grassroots BNP or Trinamool BNP, is a political party in Bangladesh founded by former minister Barrister Nazmul Huda in 2015. The party is the fourth to be founded by Huda, and the second to get registered by the Election Commission (EC). Huda first founded BNF after leaving Bangladesh Nationalist Party-BNP, although he was later expelled from BNF. The BNP and some other observers consider Trinamool BNP to be secret strategically used by the ruling party to show citizens it as a 'alternative BNP' if BNP boycotts election. Although, Trinamool BNP had tried to join ruling Grand Alliance publicly in the past.

The party struggled to get registration from the EC, and the issue even went to the courts. Although as the 2018 general election got held and the party couldn't participate because of being unregistered to EC, the issue became insignificant and remained unsolved. Later on, the party got registered by the EC in February 2023 following a court verdict ahead of the 12th general election, and the party started preparation to start political activities again. Although within 3 days of being registered, the party's chief Nazmul Huda died, making the party's future uncertain.

Name

History

Foundation

Registration issue

Death of Nazmul Huda

Ideology

Organization

References 

Political parties in Bangladesh
Political parties established in 2015
2015 establishments in Bangladesh